The 2018–19 Kategoria Superiore was the 80th official season, or 83rd season of top-tier football in Albania (including three unofficial championships during World War II) and the 19th season under the name Kategoria Superiore. The season began on 17 August 2018 and ended on 30 May 2019. Partizani, won the league title on 12 May 2019 with 3 matches to spare.

The winners of this season's Superiore earned a place in the first qualifying round of the 2019−20 Champions League, with the second and third placed clubs earning a place in the first qualifying round of the 2019−20 Europa League.

Teams
Two clubs earned promotion from the Kategoria e Parë, Kastrioti and Tirana, joined the Superiore this season. Lushnja and Vllaznia were relegated at the conclusion of last season, the latter for the second time in their history.

Locations

Stadiums

Personnel and kits

Note: Flags indicate national team as has been defined under FIFA eligibility rules. Players and Managers may hold more than one non-FIFA nationality.

Managerial changes

League table

Positions by round

Results
Clubs will play each other four times for a total of 36 matches each.

First half of season

Second half of season 

1 The opponents of Kamza awarded a 3–0 w/o win each.

Season statistics

Scoring

Top scorers

Hat-tricks

Discipline

Most yellow cards: 12
 Idriz Batha (Flamurtari)
 Marko Radaš (Skënderbeu)

Most red cards: 2
 Bojan Najdenov (Laçi)
 Leonit Abazi (Skënderbeu)
 Lancinet Sidibe (Teuta)

See also
 Kategoria Superiore
 Kategoria e Parë
 Albanian Cup

References

External links
 
Superliga at uefa.com

2018–19
Albanian Superliga
1